No Good Left to Give is the second studio album by Movements.

Track listing

Personnel
Movements
 Patrick Miranda – lead vocals
 Ira George – lead guitar
 Austin Cressey – bass guitar and rhythm guitar
 Spencer York – drums, percussion

Additional musicians and production
 Will Yip – additional percussion and keyboards; producer, engineering, and mixing
 Hank Byerly – assistant engineer
 Jeff Thomas – piano on "Don't Give Up Your Ghost" and "No Good Left to Give"

Charts

References

2020 albums
Movements (band) albums
Fearless Records albums
Albums produced by Will Yip